Running Blind is an EP by the English musician Phil Selway, best known as the drummer of the rock band Radiohead. It was released on 25 July 2011 in the United Kingdom and 30 August 2011 in the United States. The EP contains four songs that were left off Selway's album Familial (2010) and were part of Selway's live sets. The songs were re-recorded with a full band.

Reception

 
Running Blind received mixed reviews from critics. Joe Tangari from Pitchfork Media gave the album a 5.8/10 and specifically praised the song "What Goes Around", writing that it "delivers a well-crafted melody," and said that the album was  a slight improvement over its predecessor, Familial. A review from PopMatters stated that the songs "just weren't good enough" and "exposed more weaknesses than necessary."

Track listing
"Running Blind" - 4:18
"All in All" - 3:04
"Every Spit and Cough" - 4:09
"What Goes Around" - 3:55

References 

2011 EPs
Philip Selway albums
Bella Union EPs
Nonesuch Records EPs